Jed Ortmeyer (born September 3, 1978) is an American former professional ice hockey winger who played in the National Hockey League (NHL) with the New York Rangers, Nashville Predators, San Jose Sharks and Minnesota Wild. After his retirement he was inducted into the Omaha Hockey Hall of Fame in 2015. He is currently serving as the Director of Player Development with the New York Rangers.

Playing career

Amateur
Ortmeyer played junior hockey with the Omaha Lancers of the United States Hockey League (USHL) for two seasons.  He finished his first season with the Lancers, the 1997–98 season, third on the team in scoring with 48 points in 54 games.  During his second season with the Lancers, the 1998–99 season, he led the team in goals with 23 and points with 59.  During Ortmeyer's two-year stint with the Lancers, he played with future NHLers Duvie Westcott and Ryan Malone.  After two years with the team, he left to begin his NCAA college hockey career.

From 1999 through 2003, Ortmeyer played under coach Red Berenson with the University of Michigan Wolverines, in the Central Collegiate Hockey Association (CCHA). While with Michigan, Ortmeyer's teammates included future NHL players Mike Comrie, Jeff Jillson, Andy Hilbert, Mike Cammalleri, Mike Komisarek, Jeff Tambellini, and fellow New York Rangers prospect Al Montoya. In his second year with the Wolverines, Ortmeyer tore his anterior cruciate ligament (ACL) and missed the last half of the season. The following year, after fully recovering, he was named team captain and enjoyed his most productive college hockey season with a 39-point campaign in his third year.

Professional
Undrafted by an NHL team, Ortmeyer was signed by the New York Rangers on May 10, 2003. During the 2003–04 NHL season, Ortmeyer split time between the Rangers and their American Hockey League (AHL) affiliate, the Hartford Wolf Pack. He made his Rangers' debut on November 15, 2003 against the New Jersey Devils. He then scored his first NHL goal on November 25 against Nikolai Khabibulin of the Tampa Bay Lightning. He went on to finish the season with 2 goals and 4 assists with the Rangers.

Due to the 2004–05 NHL lockout, Ortmeyer spent the entirety of the following season with the Wolf Pack.  He returned to the Rangers full-time in the 2005–06 NHL season, playing on a line with Dominic Moore and Ryan Hollweg, which was known as the "HMO Line". Former Rangers Head Coach Tom Renney reflected upon the "HMO Line", saying, "They were high-octane energy and in your face and just played hard two-way Hockey." Ortmeyer also played on the Rangers' penalty kill unit.

During the 2006 off-season, the "HMO Line" was broken up when Dominic Moore was traded to the Pittsburgh Penguins. During that same off-season, Ortmeyer was sidelined indefinitely on August 14, 2006, after he was diagnosed with a pulmonary embolism. On January 2, 2007, Ortmeyer returned to the Rangers line-up after a conditioning stint with the Wolf Pack, playing 5:35 over 9 shifts.  On January 13, in his sixth game since returning, he scored on a shorthanded penalty shot against the Boston Bruins to assure a 3–1 Rangers victory. On January 29, 2007, Ortmeyer posted 3 assists and was named the first star in another game against the Bruins in Boston.

Having made a full recovery, Ortmeyer was, by the vote of Rangers fans, awarded the 2006-07 season Steven McDonald Extra Effort Award, as "the player that goes above and beyond the call of duty." Ortmeyer previously won the award for the 2003-04 season. He was also the Rangers' 2007 nominee to win the Bill Masterton Memorial Trophy for his dedication to the game, evident in his comeback.

Becoming a free agent in the 2007 off-season, Ortmeyer signed a two-year contract with the Nashville Predators on July 2. Playing in his first season with the Predators, Ortmeyer tore his ACL for the second time in his career on February 23, 2008, and missed the remainder of the 2007–08 season. He had surgery to repair his knee, but due to inactivity from the surgery he suffered from blood clots in the leg and missed the first two months of the 2008–09 season. On December 3, 2008, Ortmeyer was placed on waivers by the Predators.  After clearing, he was assigned to the Milwaukee Admirals of the AHL.

Ortmeyer signed a one-year deal with the San Jose Sharks on July 16, 2009.

On September 27, 2010, Ortmeyer accepted an invitation to the New York Islanders training camp on a Professional Tryout (PTO). He was released on October 3. He then played on PTOs with the San Antonio Rampage and Houston Aeros of the AHL before signing with the NHL's Minnesota Wild on January 4, 2011. The next day, the Wild assigned him to the Aeros, their AHL affiliate.  Ortmeyer spent the rest of 2011 and 2012, spanning over two seasons, being shuttled between the Wild and the Aeros.

A Free Agent during the NHL Lockout, Ortmeyer belatedly signed with the Missouri Mavericks of the Central Hockey League midway through the 2012–13 season on January 25, 2013. After only two games with the Mavericks, Ortmeyer returned to the AHL, signing a contract for the remainder of the year with the San Antonio Rampage on January 31, 2013.

Personal life
Ortmeyer's brother, Jake Ortmeyer, is a retired professional hockey player who was the head coach for the Omaha AAA Hockey Club Peewee, Bantam, and 16, and 18u teams.

In July 2009, Jed married his high school girlfriend, Maggie Jacobson.

Career statistics

Awards and honors

References

External links

1978 births
American men's ice hockey right wingers
Hartford Wolf Pack players
Houston Aeros (1994–2013) players
Living people
Michigan Wolverines men's ice hockey players
Milwaukee Admirals players
Minnesota Wild players
Missouri Mavericks players
Nashville Predators players
New York Rangers players
Omaha Lancers players
Sportspeople from Omaha, Nebraska
San Antonio Rampage players
San Jose Sharks players
Ice hockey people from Nebraska
Undrafted National Hockey League players